John George of Brandenburg  (11 September 1525 – 8 January 1598) was a prince-elector of the Margraviate of Brandenburg (1571–1598).

Early life 
Born as a member of the House of Hohenzollern, he was the son of Joachim II Hector, Elector of Brandenburg, and his first wife Princess Magdalena of Saxony.

Biography 
Faced with large debts of 2.5 million guilder accumulated during the reign of his father, John George instituted a grain tax which drove part of the peasantry into dependence on a nobility that was exempt from taxation. He had Jews expelled from Brandenburg in 1573, stripped of their assets and prohibited from returning. Though a staunch Lutheran opposed to the rise of Calvinism, he permitted the admission of Calvinist refugees from the wars in the Spanish Netherlands and France. On 13 July 1574, he founded the Berlinisches Gymnasium zum Grauen Kloster, the first humanistic educational institution in Berlin. He was succeeded by his son Joachim Frederick.

Upon the death of his kinsman Albert I, Duke of Prussia in 1568, the Duchy of Prussia was inherited by the latter's underage son Albert Frederick. John George's father was a co-inheritor of the Duchy of Prussia. In 1577 the Brandenburg electors became co-regent with Duke Albert Frederick of Prussia.

Family and children 
John George was married three times.

His first wife was Princess Sophie of Legnica (ca. 1525 – 6 February 1546), whom he married in 1545.  They had one child together:
 Joachim Frederick (27 January 1546 – 18 July 1608)

Secondly, he married Margravine Sabina of Brandenburg-Ansbach (12 May 1529 – 2 November 1575), daughter of George, Margrave of Brandenburg-Ansbach, in 1548. They had the following children:
 George Albert (19 February 1555 – 8 January 1557)
 John (1557 – died young), twin with Albert
 Albert (1557 – died young), twin with John
 Magdalena Sabina (1559 – died young)
 Erdmuthe (26 June 1561 – 13 November 1623), married in 1577 to Duke John Frederick of Pomerania
 Marie (1562 – died young)
 Hedwig (1563 – died young)
 Magdalena (1564 – died young)
 Margaret (1565 – died young)
 Anna Maria (3 February 1567 – 4 November 1618), married in 1581 to Duke Barnim X of Pomerania
 Sophie (6 June 1568 – 7 December 1622), married in 1582 to Elector Christian I of Saxony

Thirdly, he married Princess Elisabeth of Anhalt-Zerbst ( – 5 October 1607) in 1577. They had the following children:
 Christian (30 January 1581 – 30 May 1655)
 Magdalena (7 January 1582 – 4 May 1616), married in 1598 to Landgrave Louis V of Hesse-Darmstadt
 Joachim Ernest (22 June 1583 – 7 March 1625)
 Agnes (17 July 1584 – 26 March 1629), married:
 in 1604 Duke Philipp Julius of Pomerania;
 in 1628 Duke Francis Charles of Saxe-Lauenburg
 Frederick (22 March 1588 – 19 May 1611)
Elisabeth Sophia (13 July 1589 – 24 December 1629), married:
 in 1613 to Reichsfürst (Prince) Janusz Radziwiłł;
 on 27 February 1628 to Duke Julius Henry of Saxe-Lauenburg
 Dorothea Sibylle (19 October 1590 – 9 March 1625), married in 1610 to Duke John Christian of Brieg
 George Albert (20 November 1591 – 29 November 1615)
 Sigismund (20 November 1592 – 30 April 1640)
 John (13 July 1597 – 23 September 1627), Bishop of Havelberg
 John George (4 August 1598 – 27 January 1637)

Ancestors

References

External links 
 A portrait with ducal title

[aged 72]

1525 births
1598 deaths
Prince-electors of Brandenburg
German Lutherans
Lutheran Prince-Bishops of Brandenburg
Burials at Berlin Cathedral